Amber Fiser is an American, former collegiate All-American, softball pitcher.

Career
Fiser attended Benton Community High School. She later attended the University of Minnesota, where she was a starting pitcher for the Minnesota Golden Gophers softball team in the Big Ten Conference. She is a two-time first team conference honoree and was named Big Ten Pitcher of the Year in 2019.
 Fiser led Minnesota softball to their first ever berth in the in 2019 Women's College World Series, where they lost to Washington, 5–3. She redshirted her senior year in 2020 due to the cancellation of the season and the COVID-19 pandemic and returned to play in 2021 to complete her eligibility. Fiser was drafted No. 5 overall in the Athletes Unlimited Softball draft.

Career Statistics

References

External Links
 
Minnesota bio

Year of birth missing (living people)
Softball players from Iowa
Minnesota Golden Gophers softball players
Living people
People from Benton County, Iowa